Group 10 is a rugby league competition in the Central West area of New South Wales, under the auspices of the New South Wales Rugby League. It had been under the control of Country Rugby League but that changed after the NSWRL agreed to a new constitution and the CRL voted to wind up its affairs immediately. The decisions was made on 19 October 2019 and the merger means that the aim of a unified administration of the sport in NSW was achieved over a year ahead of time.

Ahead of the 2022 season, the leading Group 10 and Group 11 first grade and under 18s clubs merged to form the Peter McDonald Premiership. From the 2022 season, Group 10 will only officially field reserve and women's league tag competitions, although a Group 10 Premier will still be crowned in First Grade and Under 18s, with this being the best team in the Group 10 Pool of the Peter McDonald Premiership.

Origin and formation

At the end of the 1946 representative campaign, it was Bathurst that was crowned Western Challenge Cup premiers after finishing ahead of Lithgow, Orange and Oberon in the four-team group. The team's 7–0 win against Oberon in the final match of the round-robin competition in August at the Bathurst Sportsground saw the team finish the campaign undefeated.

Group 10 would meet two months later but Group 10 secretary Harley Brazil put forward a radical proposal, which alter the future of rugby league in the Central West region. Brazil put forward a "scheme" for an inter-town competition, with a goal to kick off in 1947. Brazil's idea was to see the leading eight teams in the Group (Bathurst Railway, Bathurst Waratahs, Lithgow Small Arms Factory, Lithgow Western Suburbs, Oberon, Orange Our Boys, Orange Waratahs and Portland) participate in the competition.

When the districts met in February, not everyone accepted Brazil's proposal, which become referred to as the 'Brazil plan' by the local press. Representatives from Bathurst, Orange, Lithgow, Mudgee, Oberon, Blayney and Portland would debate over three proposals for several hours. The three proposals mentioned in the Lithgow Mercury on 26 February 1947 included:

 The 'Brazil plan': The leading clubs from the major districts competing in an inter-town club competition. 
 The 'Bathurst proposal': An inter-district competition with games played every two weeks, to permit the local competitions to be played on alternative weeks. Winners of the inter-district competition would receive a prize of £100 and the Western Challenge Cup.
 The 'Orange proposal': Rugby league would conduct the same way it was in the 1946 season, with the Western Challenge Cup to be played for at least every three weeks.

Ultimately, it was the 'Brazil plan' that was adopted by 10 votes to eight but it was quickly followed by opposition from Orange and Bathurst.

Issues continued and by Group 10's annual general meeting on 16 March, tensions reached boiling point between Orange and Bathurst and the other leagues. According to the Lithgow Mercury, Bathurst and Orange were granted permission to conduct their own competitions, independent of the new inter-town club tournament.

Brazil's plan for a new inter-town club competition was thrown into turmoil, with only four teams nominating, well below the secretary's eight-team dream. At the Group's meeting on 7 April, only Lithgow Small Arms Factory, Lithgow Western Suburbs, Oberon Tigers and Portland Colts had put their hands up for the new competition.

The first ever games in Group 10 had been locked in for Sunday, 13 April. Wests would play Oberon in Lithgow, while Portland would host Factory. Both games would kick-off at 3.15pm, with curtain-raisers the local Lithgow first grade competition games. Match reports in the Lithgow Mercury indicate Wests overcame the Tigers 17–3. C. Hallam scored the first try for Wests, which may have been the first ever try scored in the competition. In the other match, Portland downed Factory 14–7. Factory won the inaugural premiership by defeating Portland 17–7 in the grand final.

Overview

The current season format consists of fourteen rounds, with each team playing each other twice. The top five teams then play-off to the McIntyre final five system, culminating in the grand final which is held at the home ground of the major semi-final winner.

Former NRL players to play in Group 10 in recent times include Luke Branighan (Oberon and Bathurst St Patrick's) and Josh Starling (Oberon and Bathurst Panthers), with the latter signing on for the Panthers ahead of the 2020 season. Former Manly forward George Rose played one season for Oberon in 2016. NSW legend Mark O'Meley played a one-off game for St Pat's in 2016. Mick Sullivan has been one of the most influential ex-NRL players in recent times, leading Orange CYMS to five premierships during his nine-season stint between 2010 and 2018, a record haul for a captain-coach in the competition's history.

Current clubs and location
First grade and under 18s sides of Group 10 Clubs play in the Peter McDonald Premiership alongside Group 11 Rugby League clubs. From the 2022 season, Group 10 will only officially field reserve and women's league tag competitions, although a Group 10 Premier will still be crowned in First Grade and Under 18s, with this being the best team in the Group 10 Pool of the Peter McDonald Premiership.

Junior Clubs 

  Bathurst Panthers
  Bathurst St Patrick's
  Blayney Bears
  Bloomfield Tigers (Feeder club for Orange Hawks)
  Cowra Magpies
  Eglington Eels Bathurst (No seniors)
  Lithgow Storm
  Mudgee Dragons
  Oberon Tigers (Seniors play in Woodbridge Cup)
  Orange CYMS
  Wallerawang Warriors (No seniors)

Previous Clubs

Past premiers
 Between 1948 and 1951, Group 10 was split into a Western Zone and an Eastern Zone, with the top teams from each zone crossing over to contest a finals series. 

 1991 finished in a 16-all draw with no points scored in extra-time. Replay was required.

Lower grades

First Division/Reserve Grade

Under 18s

Women's League Tag

Under 18s League Tag

Notes

See also

Rugby League Competitions in Australia
Mid West Cup
Woodbridge Cup

References

External links
Group 10 ladder - from Sporting Pulse

Rugby league competitions in New South Wales